Leptocarpus is a genus of shrimp belonging to the family Palaemonidae.

The species of this genus are found in Southeastern Asia.

Species:
 Leptocarpus fluminicola (Kemp, 1917) 
 Leptocarpus kempi (Jayachandran, 1992) 
 Leptocarpus potamiscus (Kemp, 1917)

References

Palaemonoidea
Decapod genera